Mushkaf Railway Station (Balochi: مشکاف ریلوے اسٹیشن) is located in Mushkaf village, Kachhi district of Balochistan province, Pakistan.

See also
 List of railway stations in Pakistan
 Pakistan Railways

References

Railway stations in Kachhi District
Railway stations on Rohri–Chaman Railway Line